Mount Popov is the broad ice-covered peak with precipitous rocky slopes rising to 1248 m in eastern Bigla Ridge on Heros Peninsula, Foyn Coast on the Antarctic Peninsula. It surmounts Beaglehole Glacier to the west and Cabinet Inlet to the northeast.

The feature is named after Todor Popov, physician at St. Kliment Ohridski Base during the 1996/97 and 1997/98 seasons.

Location
British mapping in 1974.

Maps
 British Antarctic Territory: Graham Land.  Scale 1:250000 topographic map.  BAS 250 Series, Sheet SQ 19–20.  London, 1974.
 Antarctic Digital Database (ADD). Scale 1:250000 topographic map of Antarctica. Scientific Committee on Antarctic Research (SCAR). Since 1993, regularly upgraded and updated.

Notes

References
 Mount Popov. SCAR Composite Antarctic Gazetteer.
 Bulgarian Antarctic Gazetteer. Antarctic Place-names Commission. (details in Bulgarian, basic data in English)

External links
 Mount Popov. Copernix satellite image

Popov
Foyn Coast
Bulgaria and the Antarctic